Enrico Pfister (born 7 April 1991) is a Swiss curler from Rüdtligen. He competed at the 2015 Ford World Men's Curling Championship in Halifax, Nova Scotia, Canada, as third for the Swiss team, which placed seventh in the tournament.

References

External links

1991 births
Living people
Swiss male curlers
Sportspeople from Bern
People from Emmental District
Swiss curling champions